Gravenhurst/Muskoka Bay Water Aerodrome  is located in Muskoka Bay, Lake Muskoka, and is  northwest of Gravenhurst, Ontario, Canada.

References

Registered aerodromes in Ontario
Seaplane bases in Ontario
Transport in the District Municipality of Muskoka